The following table indicates the party of elected officials in Guam, an unincorporated territory of the United States:
Governor
Lieutenant Governor
Attorney General

The table also indicates the historical party composition in the:
Territorial Legislature
Territory delegation to the United States House of Representatives

For years in which a presidential election was held, the table indicates which party's nominees won the island's presidential straw poll.

Table

See also
Elections in Guam
Government and politics in Guam
List of political parties in Guam
Politics of Guam

Political parties in Guam